The Business Women's Club is a building located on Muhammad Ali Boulevard in Downtown Louisville, Kentucky.  It was placed on the National Register of Historic Places on February 7, 2008.

The club was co-founded by Jennie Benedict in 1899.

See also
 National Register of Historic Places listings in Downtown Louisville, Kentucky

References

National Register of Historic Places in Louisville, Kentucky
Clubhouses on the National Register of Historic Places in Kentucky
History of women in Kentucky
Cultural infrastructure completed in 1911
1911 establishments in Kentucky
Women's clubhouses in the United States
Neoclassical architecture in Kentucky